The Maranganji (also rendered Margany, Mardigan) were an indigenous Australian people of the state of Queensland.

Country
They were the original people of Quilpie, Cheepie and Beehchal, and the stretch of land the Paroo River to Eulo
to Eulo. They were also present in the Bulloo River, at Ardoch, and south to the vicinity of Thargomindah, and at Dynevor Downs.

Alternative names
 Marganj
 Marnganj
 Marukanji
 Murgoan
 Murgoin
 Murngain
Mardigan 
Source:

Notes

Citations

Sources

Aboriginal peoples of Queensland